Didon is a tragédie en musique or opera in a prologue and five acts by librettist, Louise-Geneviève Gillot de Saintonge, and composer Henri Desmarets. The opera was heavily influenced by Jean-Baptiste Lully's Armide and the music of both Marc-Antoine Charpentier and Henri Dumont.

Performance history
Didon was premiered successfully by the Académie Royale de Musique at the Théâtre du Palais-Royal in Paris on 5 June 1693. The work was reprised on the following 11 September in the presence of Louis, Grand Dauphin, and revived again on the Paris stage in 1704 and 1705. 

On 10 July 1999 the first modern revival of the opera was mounted at the Festival de Beaune by Les Talens Lyriques with conductor and harpsichordist Christophe Rousset. They presented the opera later that year at the Arsenal de Metz and the L'Opéra of the Palace of Versailles. The performance from Versailles on 9 October 1999 was broadcast live on France Musique, and a CD of the live recording was later issued. The German premiere of the opera took place at the Kiel Opera House in 2007.

Roles

Synopsis
Although betrothed to Iarbe, Didon is in preparation to wed Énée. Humiliated and dreading the impending wedding, Iarbe contacts his father, the god Jupiter. Jupiter promises him vengeance and Énée is forced to leave for the conquest of Italy. Didon and Énée lament their parting. Carthage comes under the pressure of the god Mercury. Didon loses all hope, becomes insane, and commits suicide.

References

1693 operas
Operas
Opera world premieres at the Paris Opera
Operas by Henri Desmarets
French-language operas
Operas based on classical mythology
Operas based on the Aeneid
Music based on poems
Cultural depictions of Dido